The 2020 season was the Philadelphia Eagles' 88th in the National Football League and their fifth and final under head coach Doug Pederson. They failed to improve on their 9–7 record from the previous season following a 23–17 loss to the Seattle Seahawks in Week 12. They were eliminated from playoff contention for the first time since 2016 following a Week 16 loss to the Dallas Cowboys and finished with a dismal 4–11–1 record, the second worst in the National Football Conference, and their worst since 2012. After starting 3–4–1 heading into their bye week and leading the NFC East, the Eagles would lose 7 of their last 8 games. Injuries and poor quarterback play were factors in their struggles in the season. On January 11, 2021, the Eagles announced head coach Doug Pederson would not return after the season, as he was dismissed the same day. For the first time since 1998, the Eagles failed to score 30 or more points in a single game the entire season.

On July 14, 2020, the city of Philadelphia placed a ban on large events for six months, meaning that the Eagles' home games would have no fans in attendance. However, starting in week 6, Philadelphia Mayor Jim Kenney announced that the city would allow 7,500 fans to attend Eagles home games. This was reversed on November 16, 2020 as the city of Philadelphia implemented outdoor restrictions.

The season also marked the end of the Carson Wentz era in Philadelphia as he was traded to the Indianapolis Colts in the 2021 off-season.

Roster changes

Free agents

Signings

Departures

Trades
 March 19: The Eagles traded a third-round pick in the 2020 NFL Draft and a fifth-round pick in the 2020 NFL Draft to the Detroit Lions for CB Darius Slay.
 April 25: The Eagles traded their sixth-round pick in the 2020 NFL Draft, 190th overall, to the San Francisco 49ers for their sixth-round pick, 210th overall, and Marquise Goodwin

Draft

Notes
 The Eagles acquired one additional seventh-round selection, along with wide receiver DeSean Jackson, in a trade that sent their 2019 sixth-round selection to the Tampa Bay Buccaneers. However, the Eagles made trades with the Atlanta Falcons and the New England Patriots involving both their own seventh-round selection and the one acquired from the Buccaneers.
 The Eagles acquired an additional fifth-round selection in a trade that sent one of their seventh-round selections and defensive end Michael Bennett to the Patriots.
 The Eagles acquired an additional sixth-round selection, along with linebacker Duke Riley, in a trade that sent one of their seventh-round selections and safety Johnathan Cyprien to the Falcons.
 The Eagles traded a sixth-round selection to the Chicago Bears in exchange for running back Jordan Howard.
 As the result of the negative differential of free agent signings and departures that the Eagles experienced during the first wave of the 2019 free agency period, the team is projected to receive two compensatory selections for the 2020 draft. Free agent transactions that occurred after May 7, 2019 did not factor into the team's formula for determining compensatory selections.
 The Eagles traded a third-round and fifth-round selection in the 2020 NFL Draft to the Detroit Lions for cornerback Darius Slay.

Staff

Final roster

Preseason
The Eagles' preseason schedule was announced on May 7, but was later cancelled due to the COVID-19 pandemic.

Regular season

Schedule
The Eagles' 2020 schedule was announced on May 7.

Note: Intra-division opponents are in bold text.

Game summaries

Week 1: at Washington Football Team

In a near-reversal of the previous season's opener, the Eagles scored the first 17 points, only for the Washington Football Team to then shut their offense out for the remainder of the afternoon. Meanwhile, Washington's offense scored 27 unanswered points, and the defense sacked Carson Wentz eight times, recorded two interceptions, and forced three fumbles.

With the loss, Philadelphia's six-game winning streak against Washington dating back to 2016 came to an end, and the Eagles lost the first game of the season for the first time since 2015.

Week 2: vs. Los Angeles Rams

The Eagles' struggles continued in their home opener against the Los Angeles Rams. An early fumble by Miles Sanders led to a Rams touchdown by Tyler Higbee. After the Eagles cut their deficit to four with a Jake Elliott field goal, Los Angeles responded with a Robert Woods touchdown run followed by a second Higbee touchdown catch. Trailing 21–3, the Eagles closed the deficit to five points by halftime with touchdown runs by Wentz and Sanders. After forcing a three-and-out on the Rams' first possession of the second half, the Eagles would drive to the Los Angeles 21, only for Wentz's first down pass to be picked off by Darious Williams, turning the momentum back in the Rams' favor as they would outscore the Eagles 16–3 the rest of the way. Despite not being sacked once during the game, Wentz finished the day with a 56.5 passer rating, completing 26 of 43 passes for 242 yards and two interceptions.

The 37–19 blowout loss dropped Philadelphia to 0–2 for the first time since 2015, and marked the Eagles' first home opener loss since that same season. It was also the first home loss to the Rams franchise since 2001.

Week 3: vs. Cincinnati Bengals

The Eagles welcomed the Cincinnati Bengals to Lincoln Financial Field seeking their first win over Cincinnati since 2000. After a scoreless first quarter, the two teams traded field goals in the second, before the Bengals took a 10–6 lead on a touchdown reception by Tee Higgins. Wentz responded on the ensuing drive, as he threw his 100th career touchdown pass to Greg Ward to put the Eagles in front 13–10 at halftime. After the Eagles added another Jake Elliott field goal, the Bengals reclaimed a one-point lead with Higgins' second touchdown of the afternoon. Cincinnati would pad its lead to seven points with two fourth-quarter field goals. Trailing 23–16 with just over 3 minutes left in regulation, Philadelphia drove down the field to score the game-tying touchdown on a 7-yard run for Wentz. In overtime, both defenses held strong, with neither team being able to get into field goal range until the final drive, when the Eagles got to the Bengals' 41. However, a costly false start on Matt Pryor brought Philadelphia out of field goal range. The Eagles punted the ball, and the game ended on the following play with the Bengals at their own 20. Despite his milestone, Wentz's struggles continued as he also threw two interceptions for the third straight game and finished the game with a 62.8 passer rating. Philadelphia improved to 0–2–1 with the tie, but failed to snap their winless streak against Cincinnati and fell to 0–3–2 in their last five against the Bengals, including an 0–2–1 mark at Lincoln Financial Field. This marked the Eagles' first tie since 2008, which was also against the Bengals.

Week 4: at San Francisco 49ers

A depleted Eagles team stunned the 49ers on Sunday Night Football to win their first game of the season. Unknown wide receiver Travis Fulgham signed a 1-year contract before the game and caught a key go-ahead score in the 3rd quarter. Linebacker Alex Singleton also scored a touchdown on an interception which proved to be the decider.

Week 5: at Pittsburgh Steelers

After being the hero the previous week, Travis Fulgham had a breakout game with 10 receptions for 152 yards and a touchdown, but was outperformed by Steelers rookie wide receiver Chase Claypool, who scored 4 total touchdowns, 3 receiving, from 7 catches and 110 yards. The loss dropped the Eagles to 1-3-1.

Week 6: vs. Baltimore Ravens

After falling behind 17–0 in the first half, the Eagles surged back with a dominant second half to pull within two points of the Ravens in the fourth quarter. However, the furious rally came up short as Carson Wentz was stopped on a would-be game-tying two-point conversion in the final two minutes. Baltimore recovered the ensuing onside kick and ran out the clock to seal the narrow 30–28 loss. With their second straight defeat, Philadelphia dropped to 1–4–1 on the season. This was the first game in the 2020 season where Carson Wentz did not throw an interception and he was praised with the near 4th quarter comeback.

Week 7: vs. New York Giants

The Eagles recovered from a 21–10 hole. They scored 12 unanswered points and reclaimed first place in the NFC East when Boston Scott caught a game-winning touchdown pass and linebacker Brandon Graham forced a fumble on Giants quarterback Daniel Jones. This win improved the Eagles to 2–4–1. They extended their all-time series lead to 89–86–2.

Week 8: vs. Dallas Cowboys

Despite committing four turnovers and being held to a season-low seven first half points, Wentz and the Eagles bumbled their way to a crucial division win over an injury-ravaged Dallas Cowboys team led by rookie quarterback Ben DiNucci. The Cowboys opened the scoring on the game's opening drive with a 49-yard field goal by Greg Zuerlein. After a fumble by Wentz gave the Cowboys the ball back, the Eagles regained possession on a DiNucci fumble and took a 7–3 lead on Jalen Reagor's first career touchdown reception. The Cowboys responded with another Zuerlein field goal following Wentz's second fumble, and took a 9–7 halftime lead on a 59-yard field goal (mirroring the halftime score in Dallas in 2017, also played on Sunday Night Football). On the Eagles' second-half opening drive, Wentz would be picked off by Cowboys rookie cornerback Trevon Diggs, who returned the ball to the Dallas 31, but the Cowboys failed to capitalize when Zuerlein's ensuing 52-yard field goal attempt sailed wide right. The Eagles used the momentum swing to regain the lead 15–9 on a 9-yard Travis Fulgham touchdown reception. In the fourth quarter, T. J. Edwards strip-sacked DiNucci, and the ensuing fumble was recovered and returned 53 yards for a touchdown by Rodney McLeod. With the 23–9 win, Philadelphia improved to 3–4–1 on the season heading into their Week 9 bye.

Week 10: at New York Giants

The Eagles came stumbling out of the bye week and suffered their first loss to the Giants since Week 9 of the 2016 season, ending an eight-game winning streak against New York. The Eagles also fell to 1–4 after the bye in the Doug Pederson era. This left many fans and media questioning Pederson's play calling creativity. Despite a subpar performance from Wentz, he played his first turnover free game of 2020. The Eagles fell to 3–5–1, but nonetheless remained in first place in a lowly NFC East. The all-time series fell to 89–87–2.

Week 11: at Cleveland Browns

In heavy rain and wind, the Eagles would lose a defensive game. Wentz struggled again, throwing 2 interceptions and absorbing 5 sacks, and Sanders lost a fumble, wasting a good effort by the defense against a high-powered Browns offense. This loss dropped the Eagles to 3–6–1.

Week 12: vs. Seattle Seahawks

The Eagles returned home to face the Seattle Seahawks behind closed doors. Philadelphia entered the game winless against Seattle in the Russell Wilson era with an 0–5 record. After a scoreless first quarter, the Seahawks would jump to a 14-point lead on touchdowns by David Moore and Chris Carson. A drive led by Carson Wentz at the end of the first half would put the Eagles on the board, but the Seahawks would not relinquish their lead for the remainder of the game. A garbage time Hail Mary from Wentz to Richard Rodgers II pulled the Eagles within 6 points, but the Seahawks recovered the ensuing onside kick to seal Philadelphia's third straight loss. This touchdown would be Wentz's last in an Eagles uniform. The Eagles fell to 3–7–1 on the season, 0–6 against Russell Wilson, 0–7 against Pete Carroll, and 0–6 at Lincoln Financial Field against the Seahawks with the 23–17 loss.

Week 13: at Green Bay Packers
This game is noted to be the final start for the 2016 number 2 overall pick QB Carson Wentz with the Philadelphia Eagles. With the loss, the Eagles fall to 3-8-1, and have sealed their first losing season since 2016. Carson Wentz was benched in favor for Jalen Hurts after the first drive in the third quarter. On December 8, it was announced Jalen Hurts would get the starting nod in favor of Wentz.

Week 14: vs. New Orleans Saints

Jalen Hurts made his first start in Week 14 as the Eagles stunned the favored Saints and snapped their 9-game winning streak. Hurts and Miles Sanders each ran for over 100 yards on the Saints' top ranked run defense as the Eagles roared out to a 17–0 lead at halftime and were able to hold off a late Saints rally to win 24–21. This is the first win against the Saints since the 2015 season.

Week 15: at Arizona Cardinals

Coming off an upset win against the Saints, Jalen Hurts was once again named the starter for Week 15 against the Arizona Cardinals. Despite a slow start, falling behind 16–0 due to a safety and two first quarter touchdowns from Kyler Murray (one of which came off a blocked punt), three-second quarter touchdown passes from Jalen Hurts including 2 to Greg Ward allowed the Eagles to pull within 7 at halftime. The Eagles tied the score at 26 on a 7-yard run by Hurts, however due to an injury to punter Cameron Johnston, Philadelphia was left without a holder. Tight end Zach Ertz served as a backup holder on the extra point attempt, and mishandled a poor snap from long snapper Rick Lovato. Arizona would regain the lead after a successful fake punt, with Murray throwing a go-ahead 20-yard touchdown pass to DeAndre Hopkins. The Eagles attempted a comeback drive with less than 2 minutes left in the 4th quarter but on the final play of the game Jalen Hurts's pass to Goedert was knocked away, sealing the Arizona victory.

With the loss, the Eagles fall to 4-9-1, their most losses in a season since the 2016 Season. Doug Pederson announced Monday that Jalen Hurts would start again for week 16 against the Dallas Cowboys.

Week 16: at Dallas Cowboys

The game began with the Eagles having an eleven-point first quarter lead after two touchdowns. However, the tides would turn in the second quarter, and the Eagles would massively struggle from there, as their defense gave up 513 total yards and 37 points on the evening. Fletcher Cox suffered a stinger injury in the second quarter which would ultimately cost the Eagles their season. Jalen Hurts's poor performance began with turning the ball over three times, one of which led to a Cowboys scoring drive. With the loss, the Eagles dropped to 4–10–1 and were eliminated from playoff contention. They also suffered double digit losses for the first time since the 2012 season.

Week 17: vs. Washington Football Team

While Philadelphia was already eliminated when this game was conducted, the game was still relevant to the playoffs; if the Eagles won, then the New York Giants would advance as NFC East champions, while if they lost, then Washington would win the NFC East.  The game was scheduled as the final game of the regular season to ensure that the televised Sunday night football game would have playoff implications.  Despite erasing an early 10-point deficit, the Eagles lost 20–14 to Washington, who clinched the NFC East and the fourth seed as a result.  Philadelphia finished with a 4-11-1 overall record, their worst since the 2012 season, and were swept by Washington for the first time since the 2016 season.  After the game, coach Doug Pederson was criticized for taking out starting quarterback Jalen Hurts in the fourth quarter for a third-string quarterback with the game still in close contention, a move more associated with preseason games that allegedly shocked the Eagles players.  Some writers accused Pederson of throwing the game so that the Giants would miss the playoffs, and others accused him of tanking for a better draft spot.  Pederson denied the allegations. The Eagles announced Pederson's dismissal eight days later, on January 11.

Standings

Division

Conference

References

External links
 

Philadelphia
Philadelphia Eagles seasons
Philadelphia Eagles